The 128th Georgia General Assembly convened its first session on January 13, 1965, at the Georgia State Capitol in Atlanta. The 128th Georgia General Assembly succeeded the 127th and served as the precedent for the 129th General Assembly in 1967. 

Governor Carl Sanders, who was elected in 1962 as the first governor elected by popular vote since 1908, spearheaded a massive reapportionment of Georgia's General Assembly and 10 U.S. Congressional districts, providing more proportional representation to the state's urban areas. This, as well as passage of the Civil Rights Act of 1964 and Voting Rights Act of 1965 had opened voter registration to blacks, saw eleven African Americans elected to the Georgia House of Representatives in special elections in 1965 and 1966. By ending the disfranchisement of blacks through discriminatory voter registration, African Americans regained the ability to vote and entered the political process. This was the first time that African-Americans had sat in the House since W. H. Rogers of McIntosh resigned his seat in 1907 during the 99th Assembly. Among them were six from Atlanta (William Alexander, Julian Bond, Benjamin Brown, J. C. Daugherty, J. D. Grier, Grace Towns Hamilton, John Hood) and one each from Columbus (Albert Thompson) and Augusta (Richard Dent). Horace T. Ward also joined Leroy Johnson as the second African-American in the State Senate.

Controversy
On January 10, 1966, Georgia state representatives voted 184–12 not to seat Julian Bond, one of the eleven African-American members, because he had publicly endorsed SNCC's policy regarding opposition to United States involvement in the Vietnam War. They disliked his stated sympathy for persons who were "unwilling to respond to a military draft". A three-judge panel on the United States District Court for the Northern District of Georgia ruled in a 2–1 decision that the Georgia House had not violated any of Bond's constitutional rights. In 1966, the Supreme Court of the United States ruled 9–0 in the case of Bond v. Floyd (385 U.S. 116) that the Georgia House of Representatives had denied Bond his freedom of speech and was required to seat him.

Party standing

Senate
 Republicans: 9
 Democrats: 44
 Independents: 1

House

Officers

Senate
 President: Peter Zack Geer
 President pro tempore: Harry C. Jackson
 Administration Floor Leader: Julian Webb
 Secretary: George T. Stewart
 Assistant Secretary: Lamont Smith

House
 Speaker: George T. Smith
 Speaker pro tempore: Maddox Hale
 Administration Floor Leader: George Busbee
 Assistant Floor Leader: J. Robin Harris

Members of the State Senate

Members of the House

References

External links
 Georgia's Official Register 1965–1966

Georgia (U.S. state) legislative sessions
1965 in Georgia (U.S. state)
1966 in Georgia (U.S. state)